Vert-Vert is an 1804 painting by Fleury François Richard, which has been in the collection of the musée des Beaux-Arts de Lyon since around 1821. It is named after Vert-Vert, the parrot and eponymous hero of the poem Vert-Vert ou le Voyage du Perroquet de Nevers (1734) by Jean-Baptiste Gresset.

Bibliography
« Fleury François Richard » dans Sylvie Ramond (dir.), Gérard Bruyère et Léna Widerkher, Le Temps de la peinture : Lyon, 1800–1914, Lyon, Fage éditions, 2007, 335 p., ill. en coul. (notice BnF no FRBNF41073771)

1804 paintings
Birds in art
Paintings in the collection of the Museum of Fine Arts of Lyon
Paintings by Fleury François Richard